Thomas Perstedt (born 25 February 1969) is a Swedish former professional footballer who played as a goalkeeper for Örgryte IS in the Allsvenskan.

References

1969 births
Living people
Swedish footballers
Örgryte IS players
Allsvenskan players
Association football goalkeepers